The Dean of Kilfenora was based at the Cathedral Church of St Fachnan (also known as St Fachtna) in Kilfenora, Clare in the small Diocese of Kilfenora within the Church of Ireland. It is probable that the Dean and Chapter were established around the end of the 12th century.

St Fachnan's is now in a semi-ruined condition, although services are still held in the nave.

The current dean of Killaloe is also dean of Kilfenora.

Deans of Kilfenora

Source: Fasti Ecclesiæ Hibernicæ
 ?–1281 Charles (Carolus or Congalach Ó Lochlainn) (afterwards Bishop of Kilfenora, 1281)
 ?–1303 Maurice (Mauritius or Maurice Ó Briain) (afterwards Bishop of Kilfenora, 1303)
 c.1585 Daniel Shennagh
 c.1591 Donald O'Heanon
 c.1615 Donat O'Shanny
 1617-? Hygatus Lone (or Love) (died 1638)
 1625–? John Yorke
 1639–? Philip Flower
 1663–1692 Neptune Blood (senior); married Elizabeth Lone, died 1692)
 1692–1716 Neptune Blood (junior); married Isabella Pullen, died 1716)
 1716–1724 William White
 1724–1757 Jonathan Bruce
 1761–1780 Charles Coote (uncle) (died 1796)
 1781–1796 Charles Coote (nephew)
 1796–1802 Latham Coddington
 1802–1825 George Stevenson
 1825–1847 William Henry Stacpoole (died 1847)
 1847–1856 John Armstrong (died 1856)
 1856–1877 Michael Keating
 1884–1886 Robert Humphreys
 1886–1908 (retired) John Robert Copley (died 1923)

References

Deans of Kilfenora
Diocese of Limerick and Killaloe
Kilfenora